Henk de Jong (born 27 August 1964, in Drachten) is a Dutch football manager, who most recently managed Dutch Eredivisie side SC Cambuur.

Managerial career
After several years of being manager in amateur football and assistant manager in professional football, De Jong was appointed manager of SC Cambuur in April 2014. He succeeded Dwight Lodeweges who had left the club after it was announced he would become the manager of the biggest rival of Cambuur, SC Heerenveen.

He moved back to SC Cambuur in July 2019 after two years in charge of De Graafschap.

References

Living people
1964 births
People from Drachten
Dutch football managers
Eredivisie managers
Eerste Divisie managers
SC Cambuur managers
De Graafschap managers
Rinus Michels Award winners
Sportspeople from Friesland
VV Sneek Wit Zwart managers
SC Heerenveen non-playing staff
Association footballers not categorized by position
Association football players not categorized by nationality